Hinigaran, officially the Municipality of Hinigaran,  is a 1st class municipality in the province of Negros Occidental, Philippines. According to the 2020 census, it has a population of 88,909 people.

History
The early inhabitants of this town were the semi-primitive people called "Mundos" and "Ambaks". When traders and settlers from Panay started moving in, the natives were driven to the mountains. The new settlers were called "Tagahigad" and when the Spaniards came the place was called "Ginigaran" from the word "higad" but it was later spelled and pronounced as Hinigaran.

The town was founded in 1765 and Captain Basilio Mongcal was appointed as the first president in 1806. Among its first settlers were the families of Mongcal, Lagtapon, Cosio, Sario, David, Orin, Pido, Pabalinas, Luntayao, Javier, Vargas, Lucasan, Grijaldo, and Dano-og— some of whom were from Panay.

The Spaniards established the seat of the "pueblo" in Jacinto and Zamora Streets, and the town was governed by "Capitanes Municipales", Tenientes Absolato" and Cabeza de Barangays". When revolt against the Spanish Government broke out, Capitan Bibiano Gelvosa and his followers fought bravely against the Spaniards. He was the last "Capitan Municipal" when the Americans arrived.

Geography

Barangays
Hinigaran is politically subdivided into 24 barangays.

Climate

Demographics

The people in the town speak the Hiligaynon language (often called Ilonggo). Filipino and English are generally understood.

Economy

Economic profile
 Total Internal Revenue Allotment: Php P180,762,087 
 Total Income: Php 158,600,789.72 
 Major Industry: Agriculture and fishing
 Products: Nylon shell, Capiz shell, Talaba, firecrackers manufacturing
 Market Days: Thursdays and Sunday
 Town Fiesta: April 30 (Hinugyaw Festival)
 Patronal Fiesta: July 22 (Kampana Festival)
 Patron Saint: Saint Mary Magdalene

Malls/supermarkets

Lopues Value Store
Prince Hypermart
 Puregold
 Melva's Grocery
 D'Garisson Mini Mart
 Negros Grace Pharmacy Grocery Store
 Mercury Drug Store w/ Grocery Store
 KJ Fairmart

Upcoming malls/supermarkets 
 Metro Gaisano Mall 
 CityMall (Coming soon)
 Savemore (Coming soon)
 Gaisano Grand Mall (Coming soon)

Banking institutions
 BDO
 RCBC
 Producers Bank
 Banko (a subsidiary of BPI)
 Land Bank (Coming soon)
 Development Bank of the Philippime (Coming soon)
 Metro Bank (Coming soon)
 Philippine National Bank (Coming soon)
 Veterans Bank (Coming soon)

Education
 Number of Elementary Schools : 25
 Number of Secondary Schools : 7
 Hinigaran National High School

 Hinigaran Institute
 Madeleine Academy
 Pahilanga National High School
 Negros Occidental National Agro-Industrial School of Home Industries
 Esteban Jalandoni National High School Calapi Main/ Baga-as Extension
 Fundamental Baptist Christian School

 Number of college :2 — Central Philippines State University – Hinigaran Campus (2011)
 Hinigaran Polytechnic State College

Tourism
San Jose Muscovado Sugar Mill
Barangay Pilar World War II Marker
Mary Magdalene Church
Talabahan Plantation
Paradiso del Sur Beach Resort
Mini Rizal Park
Canonoy Beach Resort
Bulobito-on Beach Resort
Makikiling Point Beach Resort
Senator Esperidion Guanco Bridge
Espiso Beach Resort
Tagda Pier
Linao Lake Farm Resort
Hinigaran Sakura Tree

References

Remy Presas- Father of Martial Arts

External links
Hinigaran Profile at the Official Website of Negros Occidental
 [ Philippine Standard Geographic Code]
Philippine Census Information
Local Governance Performance Management System

Municipalities of Negros Occidental